Backusella psychrophila is a species of zygote fungus in the order Mucorales. It was described by Andrew S. Urquhart and James K. Douch in 2020. The specific epithet refers to the inability of this species to grow above 30 ˚C. The type locality is Jack Cann Reserve, Australia.

See also
 
 Fungi of Australia

References

External links
 

Mucoraceae
Fungi described in 2020